Jan Kristofer Ottosson (born January 9, 1976) is a Swedish former professional ice hockey player. Ottosson began playing hockey in Djurgården's youth organization and was later promoted to the J20-team. He made his Elitserien debut on 22 September 1994, and has since then been a regular member of the senior team, with the exception of a two-season stint at Huddinge IK. He was also on loan to Haninge HF in the 1994–95 season and Arlanda Wings in the 1996–97 season. He took a break from hockey in 2005, missing the first 18 regular season games due to family issues. He scored his 300th regular season point in Elitserien on 5 October 2010, when he made an assist to Andreas Holmqvist's goal. After the 2012/2013 season, Ottosson announced his retirement from hockey.

Career statistics

Regular season and playoffs

International

References 

Ottosson retires (Swedish)

External links 

1976 births
Swedish ice hockey right wingers
Djurgårdens IF Hockey players
Huddinge IK players
Living people
New York Islanders draft picks
Wings HC Arlanda players